The Sun Odyssey 42.2 is a French sailboat that was designed by Guy Ribadeau Dumas as an offshore cruiser and first built in 1995.

The boat is one of a series of designs with similar names and intended markets, including the 1990 Sun Odyssey 42, 1992 Sun Odyssey 42.1, the 1996 Sun Odyssey 42 CC, the 2005 Sun Odyssey 42i and the 2007 Sun Odyssey 42 DS.

The Sun Odyssey 42.2 is derived from the Voyage 12.5 and uses the same hull design as the Sun Odyssey 42 CC.

Production
The design was built by Jeanneau in France, from 1995 until 2000, but it is now out of production.

Design
The Sun Odyssey 42.2 is a recreational keelboat, built predominantly of fiberglass, with wood trim. It has a masthead sloop rig, a raked stem, a reverse transom with steps to a swim platform, an internally mounted spade-type rudder controlled by a wheel and a fixed fin keel or optional shoal-draft keel.

A  engine was a factory option.

The design was built in both three and four cabins version. The three cabin model has sleeping accommodation for six people, with a double "V"-berth in the bow cabin, two "L"-shaped settees in the main cabin and two aft cabins, both with double berths. The galley is located on the port side amidships. The galley is a straight layout and is equipped with a four-burner stove, an ice box and a double sink. A navigation station is aft of the galley, on the port side. There are two heads, one just aft of the bow cabin on the port side and one on the starboard side just forward of the starboard aft cabin. The four cabin layout adds a small cabin forward in place of starboard head and the head is relocated to the port side..

See also
List of sailing boat types

References

External links

Keelboats
1990s sailboat type designs
Sailing yachts
Sailboat type designs by Guy Ribadeau Dumas
Sailboat types built by Jeanneau